Ericameria cuneata is a species of flowering shrub in the family Asteraceae known by the common name cliff goldenbush. This plant is native to the southwestern United States (California, Nevada, Arizona, New Mexico) and northwestern Mexico (Baja California).

Ericameria cuneata grows on cliffs, mountainsides, and rocky hillsides. It is a small, glandular shrub sometimes reaching as much as 100 cm (40 inches) in height. Its wavy-edged leaves are rounded and oval-shaped, often with visible resin glands, and up to 2.5 centimeters (1 inch) long. Atop each of the many erect branches is an inflorescence of several golden yellow flower heads, each with few or up to 70 disc florets and sometimes a few short ray florets.

Varieties
Ericameria cuneata var. cuneata - California
Ericameria cuneata var. macrocephala Urbatsch - San Diego County in California
Ericameria cuneata var. spathulata (A.Gray) H.M.Hall - California, Nevada, Arizona, New Mexico, Baja California

References

External links
Jepson Manual Treatment
United States Department of Agriculture Plants Profile
Calphotos Photo gallery, University of California

cuneata
Flora of the Southwestern United States
Flora of California
Flora of Baja California
Flora of the California desert regions
Natural history of the California chaparral and woodlands
Natural history of the Colorado Desert
Natural history of the Mojave Desert
Natural history of the Peninsular Ranges
Natural history of the Transverse Ranges
Plants described in 1873
Taxa named by Asa Gray
Flora without expected TNC conservation status